Abdul Razak Cromwell (born 3 October 1994) is a Ghanaian professional footballer who plays as a defender for Central Valley Fuego.

Career

Dreams FC 
Cromwell joined Dreams FC from Ghanaian Division One Zone II side Proud United FC in November 2017 and signed a contract until 2021. Cromwell made his debut in the Ghana Premier League on 20 March 2018 against Elmina Sharks F.C. Cromwell is left footed and had played seven times for Dreams FC in the Ghana Premier League as a left back before agreeing to the move to Alabama.

Birmingham Legion 
He was personally scouted in Ghana by Jay Heaps and Tom Soehn for Legion after impressing in a pre-season competition. The loan move has an option to make the deal permanent.

Central Valley Fuego FC
On 7 January 2023, Cromwell joined USL League One side Central Valley Fuego ahead of the 2023 season.

References

External links
 

1994 births
Living people
Ghanaian footballers
Expatriate soccer players in the United States
Birmingham Legion FC players
Ghanaian expatriate footballers
Association football defenders
Ghanaian expatriate sportspeople in the United States
Dreams F.C. (Ghana) players
Central Valley Fuego FC players